"The Young Go First" is a song by the Danish rock band Warm Guns. It was released as a single from the band's 1980 album Instant Schlager. It was a small national hit and got radio airplay in Germany and Australia, where it  reached the Australian top 20 singles chart.

The Danish pop group Sound of Seduction covered the song in 1993 on the  Lars Muhl tribute album From All of Us....

Track listing

 "The Young Go First" (Muhl) – 4:23
 "Rip Off" (Muhl/Hauschildt) – 2:29

Personnel
 Lars Muhl – vocals, keyboards
 Lars Hybel – guitar, bass
 Jacob Perbøll – guitar, bass
 Jens G. Nielsen – drums

Notes

References 
Bille, Torben (1997): Politikens Dansk Rock. Politikens Forlag 
Muhl, Lars (1993): Sjæl I Flammer. Hovedland

External links
 The Young Go First on Discogs.com
 From All Of Us... on Discogs.com

1980 singles
1980 songs
Warm Guns songs
Vertigo Records singles